Răzvan Mavrodin (born 29 September 1973 in Bucharest) is a Romanian former rugby union player and a current coach. He played as a hooker.

Career 
Mavrodin played in France for Racing Club (1999/00), USA Perpignan (2000/01), Tarbes Pyrénées Rugby (2001/06), Section Paloise (2006/08), returning to Tarbes Pyrénées Rugby for the final season of his career, in 2008/09. He became the teams forwards coach for the season of 2009/10.

Mavrodin had 50 caps for Romania, from 1998 to 2007, scoring 2 tries, 10 points in aggregate. He played at three Rugby World Cup finals. At the 1999 Rugby World Cup, he played in three games, at the 2003 Rugby World Cup, in four games, and at the 2007 Rugby World Cup, in four games once more. He never score in any of his presences at the Rugby World Cup finals.

Honours

Club
Steaua Bucharest
SuperLiga : 1998/99

International
Romania
European Nations Cup: 2000

External links

1973 births
Living people
Rugby union players from Bucharest
Romanian rugby union players
Romanian rugby union coaches
Rugby union hookers
CSA Steaua București (rugby union) players
Racing 92 players
Tarbes Pyrénées Rugby players
USA Perpignan players
Section Paloise players
Romania international rugby union players
Romanian expatriate rugby union players
Expatriate rugby union players in France
Romanian expatriate sportspeople in France